Southwest Historic District, also known as Waltons Store Historic District, is a national historic district located near Waltons Store, Onslow County, North Carolina.  The district encompasses 14 contributing buildings and 2 contributing sites surrounding the crossroads community of Waltons Store.  The district includes the Southwest Primitive Baptist Church, Southwest School (c. 1913), two cemeteries, and three farmsteads associated with the Walton family.

It was listed on the National Register of Historic Places in 1989.

References

Historic districts on the National Register of Historic Places in North Carolina
Buildings and structures in Onslow County, North Carolina
National Register of Historic Places in Onslow County, North Carolina